Nikki Chooi (born January 31, 1989) is an American-Canadian classical violinist. He is a prize winner of the Queen Elisabeth Music Competition and Tchaikovsky International Violin Competition and 1st prize winner of the 2013 Michael Hill International Violin Competition, Montreal Symphony Manulife Competition, and Klein International Strings Competition. Nikki is a soloist, educator, and current Concertmaster of the Buffalo Philharmonic Orchestra. He previously served as Concertmaster of the Metropolitan Opera Orchestra in New York.

Life and career
Nikki Chooi was born in Victoria, British Columbia, Canada to parents of Chinese descent. He began the violin at the age of four in the Suzuki method at the Victoria Conservatory of Music and at age nine, he became a protege of Canadian violinist, Sydney Humphreys.

In 2000, Chooi made his orchestral debut with the Victoria Symphony Orchestra and was subsequently invited to perform at the 2001 Victoria Symphony "Splash" held at the Victoria Inner Harbour for an audience of over 50,000 people. That same year, aged twelve, he performed Haydn's Violin Concerto in C Major with the Sinfonia Toronto Orchestra at the Glenn Gould Studio, this was recorded and broadcast nationally by CBC Radio.

In 2003, he began studies with Bill van der Sloot at the Mount Royal Conservatory in Calgary, Canada. His summer studies included attending the Morningside Music Bridge and the Young Artist Programme at the National Arts Centre. While he was still in high school, Chooi won First Prize at the 2004 Canadian National Music Festival, and a few months later he won the 2004 Montreal Standard Life Competition where he debuted with the  Montreal Symphony Orchestra under the baton of Jacque Lacombe. In 2007, he was the awarded a "Special Prize" at International Tchaikovsky Competition held in Moscow, Russia.

Chooi attended the Curtis Institute of Music and the Juilliard School. His mentors have included Ida Kavafian, Joseph Silverstein, and Donald Weilerstein. He has also worked closely with Pamela Frank, Shmuel Ashkenasi, Peter Wiley, and Pinchas Zukerman.

Over the years, Chooi has performed with orchestras in Canada and internationally such as the St Petersburg State Symphony, Malaysian Philharmonic Orchestra, National Arts Centre Orchestra, Calgary Philharmonic, Auckland Philharmonia, Montreal Symphony Orchestra, Orchestre Royal de Chambre de Wallonie, and the National Orchestra of Belgium. As a recitalist, he has performed at the Vancouver Recital Series, Musica Viva Australia, Carnegie's Weill Recital Hall, Astral Artist Concert Series in Philadelphia, and the Harris Theatre of Chicago. His chamber music interests have taken him to perform at the Ravinia Festival, Chamber Music Northwest, the Dresden Music Festival, the Moritzburg Festival in Germany, the Marlboro Music Festival and he has toured with Musicians from Marlboro.

Chooi performs regularly with his violinist brother, Timothy Chooi. Together, they have performed with the Edmonton Symphony, Newfoundland Symphony, Malaysian Philharmonic and in recital at the Orford Centre for the Arts, Ottawa Chamber Music Festival, and the Mooredale Series in Toronto.

During the 2015–2016 season, Chooi was a member of the ensemble Time for Three, performing internationally with highlights in Barbados, Grand Teton, La Jolla SummerFest, and with the Hong Kong Philharmonic.

Awards
Chooi has received several prestigious awards over the years.

2004 First Prize Winner of the Canadian National Music Festival, Charlottetown, Canada
2004 First Prize Winner of the Canadian Music Competition, Toronto, Canada
2004 First Prize Winner of the Montreal Standard Life Competition, Montreal, Canada
2007 Special Prize at the 2007 International Tchaikovsky Competition
2008 Recipient of the Sylva Gelber Foundation Award
2009 Recipient of the Canada Council for the Arts Music Instrument Bank Competition, Toronto, Canada
2009 First Prize Klein Competition, San Francisco, United States
2012 Laureate of the 2012 Queen Elisabeth Competition, Brussels, Belgium
2013 First Prize at the Michael Hill International Violin Competition

Discography
2021: Vivaldi Four Seasons (Beau Fleuve)
2021: Violin Repertoire Levels 4-8 (Royal Conservatory of Music)
2020: Schmitt Legende, Op. 66 for Violin and Orchestra 
2014: Debut recording of works by Gershwin, Prokofiev, and Ravel (Atoll Label)

See also
Timothy Chooi
List of Stradivarius instruments

References

External links

Astral Profile Page
Time for Three
Music.cbc.ca
Theviolinchannel.com
Music.cbc.ca

1989 births
Living people
Canadian classical violinists
Musicians from Victoria, British Columbia
Curtis Institute of Music alumni
Canadian people of Chinese descent
Canadian expatriate musicians in the United States
21st-century classical violinists
21st-century Canadian violinists and fiddlers
Canadian male violinists and fiddlers